John Andrew & Son (est.1869) was an engraving firm in Boston, Massachusetts, established by John Andrew and his son George T. Andrew. Work produced by the firm appeared in publications of Lee & Shepard and Edward S. Curtis, and in titles such as Anthony's Photographic Bulletin. The business was located on Temple Place (1870s-1890s) and Summer Street (ca.1910s). Among the employees: Allan Evans Herrick, George A. Teel, and  R.B. Whitney

References

External links

 Sterling and Francine Clark Art Institute (Massachusetts). John Andrew & Son sample book of photogravures, ca.1915

American engravers
Economic history of Boston
Financial District, Boston
19th century in Boston
Companies established in 1869
1869 establishments in Massachusetts